The Daily Outlook Afghanistan is the first independent English newspaper in Afghanistan. It covers national and international news with circulation of 10,000. It is published by Afghanistan Group of Newspapers, an independent media group which also publishes The Daily Afghanistan, the largest Dari and Pashto paper in Afghanistan.  The final news releases on the website were on 14 and 15 August 2021, shortly before the fall of Kabul.

Circulation
Daily Outlook Afghanistan mostly goes to embassies, non-governmental organizations (NGOs), United Nations agencies, public places, educational institutions and other organizations. Both papers go to 32 out of 34 provinces. A limited number of copies also go to Pakistan and Dubai.

Free and independent media
The Daily Outlook Afghanistan is the first English newspaper in Afghanistan.  Due to its large national circulation,  The Daily Outlook Afghanistan receives extensive business advertisements.

External links
Official website of The Daily Outlook Afghanistan
Dari version of The daily Outlook Afghanistan

Daily newspapers published in Afghanistan
2004 establishments in Afghanistan
Publications established in 2004

no:Daily Outlook Afghanistan
pl:Daily Outlook Afghanistan